"Of Hypocrisy and Cheekbones" is an Indian poem by the Indian English writer and translator Shahnaz Habib. The poem won First Prize in the Ninth All India Poetry Competition conducted by The Poetry Society (India) in 2000.

Excerpts from the poem

Sometimes you see a man
With such irresistible cheekbones
You feel an urge to raise your hand
And touch them
Simply to know how they feel
To your skin.
And then he looks full in your face
And dazzles you with a reckless, innocent smile,
Not of invitation, merely inviting.

And then,
All those years of prudent upbringing,
Your religion, your values,
The stern concern of your father
The hushed chiding of your mother,
The sour wisdom of generations
The hardened core of civilisations
Rise in indignation within you

And quash the cave-woman
Mercilessly
So that you give him
A grim, ladylike glare
And turn your face away in disgust.

 *****

And then,
The next day you take care
Without really thinking why,
Not to get into the same bus.

Comments and criticism

The poem has received critical acclaim since its first publication in 2000 in the book Emerging Voices and has since been widely anthologised. The poem has been frequently quoted in scholarly analysis of contemporary Indian English poetry.

See also
The Poetry Society (India)

Notes

External links
  Ninth National Poetry Competition 2000 – Award Winners
  Shahnaz Habib – Inside Outside
  India Writes – Contemporary Indian Poetry
"Popular Indian Poems"

Indian English poems
2000 poems
Works originally published in Indian magazines
Works originally published in literary magazines